The Men's downhill competition at the 2017 World Championships was scheduled for Saturday, 11 February. Postponed due to fog, it was run from a lower start on Sunday, 12 February.

Switzerland's Beat Feuz won the gold medal, Erik Guay of Canada took the silver, and the bronze medalist was Max Franz of Austria.

Results
The race started at 13:30 CET (UTC+1).

References

Men's downhill
2017